Balacra basilewskyi is a moth of the family Erebidae. It was described by Sergius G. Kiriakoff in 1953. It is found in the Afrotropical realm.

References

Balacra
Moths described in 1953
Erebid moths of Africa